All of the above may refer to:

 All of the Above (Hillsong United album)
 All of the Above (John Hall album)
 All of the Above (J-Live album), or the title song
 All of the Above (Youth Alive album), or the title song
 "All of the Above", a song by Big City Rock
 "All of the Above", a song by Transatlantic from SMPT:e

See also
 "All the Above" (Beanie Sigel song)
 "All the Above" (Maino song)
 None of the above, a ballot choice